Cinzia Monreale (born Cinzia Moscone; 22 June 1957) is an Italian actress.  She is best known for her roles in the horror classics Beyond the Darkness and The Beyond.

Early life
Monreale was born in Genoa. She is the daughter of lyric singer Mirella Zaza.

Career
Monreale was active as runway model before starting her film career.  In 1975, at age 17, she made her film debut in a minor role in the Vittorio Sindoni's comedy Son tornate a fiorire le rose, then she got her first main roles again with Sindoni, in the comedies Perdutamente tuo... mi firmo Macaluso Carmelo fu Giuseppe and Per amore di Cesarina.

Monreale appeared in several films throughout the seventies, including the Spaghetti Western Silver Saddle, which was her first time working with famed horror film director Lucio Fulci.  In 1979, at age 22, she starred in a leading role with director Joe D'Amato in Buio Omega (Beyond the Darkness), and in 1981, again working with Fulci, she appeared as 'Emily' in the cult horror classic The Beyond, with Catriona MacColl and David Warbeck.  Other roles include Joe D'Amato's Return From Death (a.k.a. Frankenstein 2000), Lucio Fulci's Warriors of the Year 2072 and The Sweet House of Horrors, the award-winning Festival directed by Pupi Avati, Under the Skin, and When a Man Loves a Woman.

Monreale has also worked as a producer.  She served as a videographer in the 2005 original documentary Kill Gil: Volume 1 and she produced the 2006 documentary Kill Gil: Volume 2. She is also active on television, in TV-movies and series.

Filmography

References

External links

1957 births
Living people
Actors from Genoa
Italian film actresses
Italian television actresses
20th-century Italian actresses
21st-century Italian actresses